Nevill Holt Opera is an arts festival at the end of June and beginning of July that is held at Nevill Holt Hall in Leicestershire, the home of Carphone Warehouse co-founder David Ross.

History
Nevill Holt Opera launched its first independent season in 2013 with a staging of The Magic Flute. The venue previously hosted Grange Park Opera.

The annual event features a headline opera production as well as an open-air exhibition of contemporary British sculpture featuring artists such as Marc Quinn, Allen Jones and Peter Randall-Page.

The opera company aims to celebrate young British talent and tries to cast young singers, offering them a chance to launch their career.

A new 400-seat opera house in the stable block by architects Witherford Watson Mann opened in June 2018. In July 2019, the new opera house made the shortlist for the Stirling Prize for excellence in architecture.

The 2021 festival was held in the open air. The two operas performed were La Traviata and Don Giovanni.

Education

Nevill Holt Opera operates an education programme in partnership with music, design and drama teachers. It has worked with over 600 children in the local area, providing workshops and opportunities for children to see the dress rehearsals of the opera productions. Children of the Malcolm Arnold Academy in Northamptonshire were involved in helping to design the logo of the opera festival.

The education programme is financed by the David Ross Foundation, the Garfield Weston Foundation and UBS Bank.

Past productions
2013 The Magic Flute by Wolfgang Amadeus Mozart - Directed by Oliver Mears
2014 La Boheme by Giacomo Puccini – Directed by Ashley Page
2015 Carmen by Georges Bizet – Directed by Ashley Page
2016 Rigoletto and L'elisir d'amore
2017 Noye's Fludde and Tosca
2018 Le Nozze di Figaro and Powder Her Face

References

External links
 

Classical music festivals in England
Opera festivals
Music festivals established in 2013
2013 establishments in England